New Holland (Pennsylvania Dutch: Seischwamm) is a borough in Lancaster County, Pennsylvania. As of the 2020 census, the population was 5,762, up from 5,378 in the 2010 census.

History
New Holland was settled in 1728 by brothers John Michael and John Phillip Ranc (Ranck). Before it became known as New Holland, it had been called "Hog Swamp", "Earltown" and "New Design".

The New Holland Machine Company, which later became New Holland Agriculture was founded here in 1895 by Abe Zimmerman. New Holland Agriculture is listed alongside John Casper Stoever Log House on the National Register of Historic Places.

New Holland has been the twin city of Longvic, France since 1967 because there was a Case New Holland plant in the French commune.

Geography
New Holland is located in eastern Lancaster County at  (40.102095, -76.087646). Pennsylvania Route 23 passes through the borough as Main Street, leading east  to Morgantown and west  to Lancaster, the county seat.

The borough lies on a low ridge, with the north side draining via Groff Creek and other small streams to the Conestoga River and the south side draining to Mill Creek, a west-flowing tributary of the Conestoga, which flows southwest to the Susquehanna River.

Rail
New Holland is a terminus of the New Holland Secondary rail line, which splits off the Amtrak Keystone Line just east of Lancaster. The line is owned by Norfolk Southern Railway and serves a number of businesses along the way, notably RR Donnelley and Sons Printing in Lancaster, as well as one of the Dart Container factories, and L&S Sweeteners, both in Leola.

Demographics

As of the census of 2000, there were 5,092 people, 2,084 households, and 1,448 families residing in the borough. The population density was 2,444.2 people per square mile (945.2/km2). There were 2,159 housing units at an average density of 1,036.3 per square mile (400.8/km2). The racial makeup of the borough was 90.34% White, 1.02% African American, 0.08% Native American, .025% Asian, 0.02% Pacific Islander, 2.57% from other races, and 1.67% from two or more races. Hispanic or Latino of any race were 6.42% of the population.

The age demographics in the borough are diverse, with 22.4% under the age of 18, 8.1% from 18 to 24, 28.6% from 25 to 44, 24.9% from 45 to 64, and 16.1% who were 65 years of age or older. The median age was 40 years. For every 100 females there were 95.3 males. For every 100 females age 18 and over, there were 94.1 males.

The median income for a household in the borough was $44,446, and the median income for a family was $50,758. Males had a median income of $37,002 versus $25,766 for females. The per capita income for the borough was $20,187. About 3.4% of families and 5.2% of the population were below the poverty line, including 7.5% of those under age 18 and 1.5% of those age 65 or over.

Public services

Education
The Eastern Lancaster County School District has its district headquarters in New Holland. This site houses Garden Spot High School and Garden Spot Middle School. Elementary schools within the district include New Holland, Blue Ball and Brecknock.

The area is served by the Eastern Lancaster County Library (ELANCO Library), formerly known as New Holland Library. The ELANCO Library is located on Chestnut Street in New Holland and is a member of the Library System of Lancaster County.

Culture
The New Holland Farmers Fair is an annual festival held in New Holland. Since its inception in 1927, the fair has been held 88 times; due to World War II, the fair was not held from 1941 to 1945. The fair was not held in 2020 due to the COVID-19 pandemic.

Notable people
John Wesley Davis, former Speaker of the United States House of Representatives
Todd O'Brien, professional basketball player
Brenda Stauffer, bronze medal recipient in the 1984 Summer Olympics
Richard Winters, WWII officer and veteran of D-Day, Market Garden, Carentan and the Battle of the Bulge; main character in Band of Brothers

References

External links
 
 A Brief History of New Holland
 New Holland Farmer's Fair
 New Holland Weather
 New Holland Historical Society

 
Populated places established in 1728
Boroughs in Lancaster County, Pennsylvania
1728 establishments in Pennsylvania